Route 39 is a two-lane highway in southwest Missouri.  Its northern terminus is at U.S. Route 54 between Collins and El Dorado Springs at the community of Cedar Springs; its southern terminus is at the Arkansas state line (north of Berryville, Arkansas) where it continues as Highway 221.

Route 39 is one of the original 1922 state highways.  At that time, its southern terminus was at the Dade/Lawrence County line south of Pennsboro.

There is a short Business Route 39 in Mount Vernon.

Route description
Route 39 begins at US 54 in Cedar County, heading south-southeast towards Stockton.  About one mile (1.6 km) before reaching Stockton, the road begins a brief concurrency with Route 32 before turning south again.  Two miles south of Stockton is the western terminus of Route 215. Route 39 enters Dade County north of Arcola and south of that village, Route 39 crosses a branch of Stockton Lake.

At Greenfield is the beginning of a concurrency with U.S. Route 160 which last for two miles (3 km), with US 160 turning west and Route 39 continuing south to South Greenfield. The route enters Lawrence County south of Pennsboro.  At Albatross is an intersection with Route 96.

At the north edge of Mount Vernon is the western terminus of Route 174, and two miles (3 km) further south, Route 39 turns east, joining Business Loop I-44 for about two miles (3 km).  At Interstate 44, the business loop ends, and Route 265 begins and the two will be united to Aurora, where Route 39 intersects U.S. Route 60.

South of Aurora, Route 39 enters Barry County and heads straight south for about sixteen miles and intersects Route 248.  The highway then enters the Mark Twain National Forest.  Eight miles south of Route 248, Route 39 forms a brief concurrency with Route 76, then turns south again.  At Shell Knob, Route 39 crosses Table Rock Lake. At Viola Route 39 enters Stone County and further south at Carr Lane is an intersection with Route 86, and one mile (1.6 km) further south the highway crosses the Arkansas state line.

Major intersections

References

039
Transportation in Stone County, Missouri
Transportation in Barry County, Missouri
Transportation in Lawrence County, Missouri
Transportation in Dade County, Missouri
Transportation in Cedar County, Missouri